The Chishtī Order ( chishtī) is a tariqa, an order or school within the mystic Sufi tradition of Sunni Islam. The Chishti Order is known for its emphasis on love, tolerance, and openness. It began with Abu Ishaq Shami in Chisht, a small town near Herat, Afghanistan about 930 AD.

The Chishti Order is primarily followed in Afghanistan and the Indian subcontinent. It was the first of the four main Sufi orders (Chishti, Qadiri, Suhrawardi and Naqshbandi) to be established in this region. Khwaja Muinuddin Chishti introduced the Chishti Order in Ajmer (Rajasthan, India) sometime in the middle of the 12th century. He was eighth in the line of succession from the founder of the Chishti Order, Abu Ishaq Shami. There are now several branches of the order, which has been the most prominent South Asian Sufi brotherhood since the 12th century.

In the last century, the order has spread outside Afghanistan and the Indian subcontinent. Chishti teachers have established centers in the United Kingdom, United States, Canada, Australia, Eastern and Southern Africa.

Guiding principles
The Chishti shaykhs have stressed the importance of keeping a distance from worldly power. A ruler could be a patron or a disciple, but he or she was always to be treated as just another devotee. A Chishti teacher should not attend the court or be involved in matters of state, as this will corrupt the soul with worldly matters. In his last discourse to his disciples, Khawaja Moinuddin Chishti said:

Chishti practice is also notable for Sama: evoking the divine presence by listening to and losing oneself in a form of music and poetry, usually Qawwali. The Chishti, and some other Sufi orders, believe that Sama can help devotees forget self in the love of Allah. However, the order also insists that followers observe the full range of Muslim obligations; it does not dismiss them as mere legalism, as some strands of Sufism have done.

However some Qadiris point out that the Chishti Order and Moinuddin Chishti never permitted musical instruments, and cite a Chishti, Muhammad Ibn Mubarak Kirmani, the Mureed of Khwaja Fareed al-Deen Ganj-e-Shakar, who wrote in his Siyar al-Awliya that Nizamuddin Auliya said the following:

Furthermore, Nizamuddin Auliya said:

Practices 
The Chishtis follow five basic devotional practices (dhikr).

 Reciting the names of Allāh loudly, sitting in the prescribed posture at prescribed times (dhikr-i jali)
 Reciting the names of Allāh silently (dhikr-i khafī)
 Regulating the breath (pās-i anfās)
 Absorption in mystic contemplation (murā-ḳāba)
 Forty days or more days of spiritual confinement in a lonely corner or cell for prayer and contemplation (čilla)

Literature
Early Chishti shaykhs adopted concepts and doctrines outlined in two influential Sufi texts: the ʿAwārif al-Maʿārif of Shaykh Shihāb al-Dīn Suhrawardī and the Kashf al-Maḥjūb of Ali Hujwīrī. These texts are still read and respected today. Chishtis also read collections of the sayings, speeches, poems, and letters of the shaykhs. These collections, called malfūẓāt, were prepared by the shaykh's disciples.

Spiritual lineage

Sufi orders trace their origins ultimately to the Islamic prophet Muhammad, who is believed to have instructed his successor in mystical teachings and practices in addition to the Qur'an or hidden within the Qur'an. Opinions differ as to this successor. Almost all Sufi orders trace their origins to 'Alī ibn Abī Ṭālib, Muhammad's cousin.

The traditional silsila (spiritual lineage) of the Chishti order is as follows:

Muḥammad
Ali ibn Abu Talib
Al-Ḥasan al-Baṣrī (d. 728, an early Persian Muslim theologian)
'Abdul Wāḥid ibn Zaid Abul Faḍl (d. 793, an early Sufi saint)
Fuḍayl ibn 'Iyāḍ ibn Mas'ūd ibn Bishr al-Tamīmī
Ibrāhīm ibn Adham (a legendary early Sufi ascetic)
Khwaja Sadid ad-Din Huzaifa al-Marashi Basra Iraq
Abu Hubayra al-Basri Basra Iraq
Khwaja Mumshad Uluw Al Dīnawarī
Abu Ishaq Shamī (d. 940, founder of the Chishti order proper)
Abu Aḥmad Abdal Chishti
Abu Muḥammad Chishti
Abu Yusuf Nasar-ud-Din Chishtī
Qutab-ud-Din Maudood Chishtī
Haji Sharif Zindani (d. 1215)
Usman Harooni (d. 1220)
Mu'īnuddīn Chishtī (Moinuddin Chishti) (1141–1230 or 1142–1236)
Qutab-ud-Din Bakhtyar Kaki (1173–1228)
Farīduddīn Mas'ūd ("Baba Farid", 1173 or 1175–1266)

After Farīduddīn Mas'ūd, the Chishti order divided into two branches:

Chishtī Sabri, who follow Alauddin Sabir Kaliyari (Sabiri/Sabriya branch)
Chishtī Nizami who follow Nizāmuddīn Auliyā. (Nizami/Nizamiya branch)

History

The Encyclopedia of Islam divides Chishti history into four periods:
 
 Era of the great shaykhs (circa 597/1200 to 757/1356)
 Era of the provincial khānaḳāhs (8th/14th & 9th/15th centuries)
 Rise of the Ṣābiriyya branch (9th/15th century onwards)
 Revival of the Niẓāmiyya branch (12th/18th century onwards)

The order was founded by Abu Ishaq Shami ("the Syrian") who taught Sufism in the town of Chisht, some 95 miles east of Herat in present-day western Afghanistan. Before returning to Syria, where he is now buried next to Ibn Arabi at Jabal Qasioun, Shami initiated, trained and deputized the son of the local emir, Abu Ahmad Abdal. Under the leadership of Abu Ahmad's descendants, the Chishtiya, as they are also known, flourished as a regional mystical order.

The founder of the Chishti Order in South Asia was Moinuddin Chishti. He was born in the province of Silistan in eastern Persia around 536 AH (1141 CE) into a sayyid family claiming descent from Muhammad. When he was just nine, he memorized the Qur'an, thus becoming a hafiz. His father died when he was a teenager; Moinuddin inherited the family grinding mill and orchard. He sold everything and gave the proceeds to the poor. He traveled to Balkh and Samarkand, where he studied the Qur'an, hadith, and fiqh. He looked for something beyond scholarship and law and studied under the Chishti shaykh Usman Harooni (Harvani). He moved to Lahore and then to Ajmer, where he died. His tomb, in Ajmer, is the Dargah Sharif, a popular shrine and pilgrimage site.

Moinuddin was followed by Qutab-ud-Din Bakhtyar Kaki and Farīduddīn Mas'ūd 'Baba Farid'. After Fariduddin, the Chishti Order of South Asia split into two branches. Each branch was named after one of Fariduddin's successors.

 Nizamuddin Auliya – the Chishti Nizami branch
 Alauddin Sabir Kaliyari – the Chishti-Sabiri branch

It was after Nizamuddin Auliya that the Chishti Sufism chain spread throughout the Indian Peninsula. Two prominent lines of transmission arose from Nizamuddin Auliya, one from his disciple Nasiruddin Chiragh Dehlavi and the other from another disciple, Akhi Siraj Aainae Hind, who migrated to West Bengal from Delhi on Nizamuddin Auliya's order. Siraj Aanae Hind was followed by his notable disciple Alaul Haq Pandavi settled in Pandava, West Bengal itself. From this chain of transmission another prominent sub-branch of Chishti way emerged known as Ashrafia Silsila after the illustrious saint Ashraf Jahangir Semnani, who was the disciple of Alaul Haq Pandavi in the thirteen century A.D. Later, yet other traditions branched from the Chishti lineage; in many cases they merged with other popular Sufi orders in South Asia.

As a result of this merging of the Chishti order with other branches, most Sufi masters now initiate their disciples in all the four major orders of South Asia: Chishti, Suhrawadi, Qadri, and Naqshbandi. They do however teach devotional practices typical of the order with which they are primarily associated.

The Chishti order has also absorbed influences and merged at times with various antinomian faqiri Sufi groups, especially the Qalandar. Some Chishtis both past and present have lived as renunciants or as wandering dervish.

The first Chishti master in the West was Ḥazrat Pīr-o-Murshid 'Ināyat Khān, who came to the West in 1910 and established centers in Europe and the U.S. His lineage-successors were Pīr Vilāyat 'Ināyat Khān (d. 2004) and Pīr Zīa 'Ināyat-Khān, the current head of the 'Ināyatīyya. This tariqat is unusual in that it accepts seekers of all faiths without asking conversion to formal Islam, a controversial practice but which is customary in the Nizāmi branch going back to Nizāmuddīn Auliya and later made written policy by Shah Kalīmullāh Jahanabadi in the early 1700s CE.

In 1937 the Sufi imam Al-Hajj Wali Akram founded the First Cleveland Mosque, made his Sufi affiliation public and during the 1950s started to introduce new members to the Chishti, making the mosque the first public Sufi center of the United States. In more recent times, a more contemporary expression of traditional Chishti Sufi practices can be found in the establishment of the Ishq-Nuri Tariqa in the 1960s, as a branch of the Chishti-Nizami silsila.

In addition, a number of mixed-Sufi type groups or movements in Islam, have also been influenced by the Chishti Order proper. The best known and most widespread example is of the Jamaat Ahle Sunnat, a Sunni Muslim sect with a huge international following, which is in essence not a proper Sufi organization, though adopting many Sufi customs and traditions.

Indo-Islamic rulers

From the 14th century onwards (during the rule of the Tughluqs), the Chishti Order came to be associated with political prosperity for the Indian subcontinent's Muslim kingdoms. The Delhi Sultanate, Bahmani Sultanate, Bengal Sultanate, and various provincial dynasties associated themselves with Shaikhs of the Chishti Order for good fortune. Shrines of prominent Shaikhs were patronised by ruling dynasties, who made pilgrimages to these sites. Often the founding member of a kingdom paid respects to a Chishti Shaikh as a way of legitimising their new state, and this Shaikh became closely associated with the whole dynasty. For example, fourteen successive Bengal Sultans considered Shaikh 'Ala Al-Haq to be their spiritual master.

Several rulers of the Mughal dynasty of South Asia were Chishti devotees, and they associated with the Order in a similar fashion to the Mughals' predecessors. The emperor Akbar was perhaps the most fervent of them. It is said to be by the blessing of Shaikh Salim Chishti that Akbar's first surviving child, the future Jahangir, was born. The child was named Salim after the sheikh and was affectionately addressed by Akbar as Sheikhu Baba.

Akbar also credited the Chishti Shaikhs with his victory at the Siege of Chittorgarh. Akbar had vowed to visit the Chishti dargah, the tomb of Moinuddin Chishti, at Ajmer if he were victorious. He fulfilled his vow by visiting the dargah with his musicians, who played in honor of the sheikh.

Shah Jahan's daughter, Jahanara Begum Sahib, was also a devout follower of the Chishti Order. Shah Jahan's son Aurangzeb patronised various Chishti shrines.

Other notable Chishti shaykhs
 Qutb ud deen Modood Chishti 527 A.H
 Haji Shareef zandani 612 A.H
Usman Harooni 617 A.H
 Moinuddin Chishti 
 Qut ul aqtab Qutb ud deen Bakhtiyar kaki 635 A.H (Delhi, India)
 Fareed ud deen Mas’ood Ganj E Shakar 668 A.H (Pak Patan Sharif, Pakistan)
 Naseer ud deen Mahmood Charagh Dehlavi 757 A.H (Delhi, India)
Tajuddin Chishti (Chishtian Sharif, Pakistan)
 Amir Khusro (Delhi, India)
 Akhi Siraj Aainae Hind (Dist. Malda, West Bengal, India) 
 Alaul Haq Pandavi (Dist. Malda, West Bengal, India)
 Nur Qutb Alam (Dist. Malda, West Bengal, India)
 Ashraf Jahangir Semnani (Kichaucha, Uttar Pradesh, India)
 Burhanuddin Gharib (Maharashtra, India) 
 Bande Nawaz (Gulbarga, India) 
 Salim Chishti (Fatehpur Sikri, India) 
 Noor Muhammad Maharvi1205 A.H (Mahar Sharif, Pakistan) 
 Muhammad Suleman Taunsvi 1267 A.H (Taunsa Sharif, Pakistan)
 Ata Hussain Fani Chishti (Bihar, India)
 Khwaja Ghulam Farid (Mithankot, Pakistan)
 Muhammad Shamsuddin Sialvi 1300 A.H (Sial Sharif, Pakistan)
 Ahamed Mohiyudheen Noorishah Jeelani (Noori Maskan, Hyderabad)
 Meher Ali Shah (Golra Sharif, Pakistan)
 Inayat Khan (Vadodara, Gujarat)
 Haji Imdadullah Muhajir Makki (Muzaffarnagar, India/Makkah, Saudi Arabia)

See also

 Waris Shah
 Sabri Brothers
 Nusrat Fateh Ali Khan
 Hakim Ahmad Shuja
 Sufi Ruhaniat International
 Syed Waheed ashraf
 Ajmer rape case

Notes

References
 Haeri, Muneera (2000) The Chishtis: a living light Oxford University Press, Oxford, UK, 
 Ernst, Carl W. and Lawrence, Bruce B. (2002) Sufi Martyrs of Love: The Chishti Order in South Asia and Beyond Palgrave Macmillan, New York, . Excerpts
 Farīdī, Iḥtishāmuddīn (1992) Tārīk̲h̲-i iblāg̲h̲-i Cisht Āl Inḍiyā Baz-i Ḥanafī, Delhi, OCLC 29752219 in Urdu with biographies
 Āryā, Ghulām 'Alī (2004) Ṭarīqah-i Chishtīyah dar Hind va Pākistān: ta’līf-i Ghulām‘alī Āryā Zavvār, Tehran,  in Persian
 Chopra, R.M., "SUFISM", 2016, Anuradha Prakashan, New Delhi. .

Sunni Sufi orders
 
Sufism in Afghanistan
Sufism in Bangladesh
Sufism in India
Sufism in Pakistan